Boran-sur-Oise (literally Boran on Oise) is a commune in the Oise department in northern France.

Population

See also 
 Communes of the Oise department

References 

Communes of Oise